XHMOR-FM is a radio station on 99.1 FM in Yautepec de Zaragoza, Morelos, primarily serving Cuernavaca. It is owned by Grupo Diario de Morelos and carries an adult contemporary format known as La 99.

History
XHMOR received its concession on October 29, 1992. It was initially owned by Federico Bracamontes Galvez, founder of the Diario de Morelos newspaper. The two media remain co-owned.

This station was previously known as Mix 99.1.

References

Radio stations in Morelos